McKeand is a Scottish surname. Notable people with the surname include:

Hannah McKeand (born 1973), British polar explorer
Les McKeand (1924–1978), Australian triple jumper and javelin thrower

See also
McKean (surname)

English-language surnames